Rachel Brown (born 1980) is an English former footballer.

Rachel Brown may also refer to:

Rachel Fuller Brown (1898–1980), American chemist
Rachel Brown (flautist), British flautist and author
Rachel Brown (musician), American singer
Rachel Brown (scientist) (born 1970), New Zealand nutritional scientist
Rachel Fulton Brown, American professor of medieval history
Rachelle Brown or Rachel Brown (born 1986), Canadian curler

See also
Rachel Browne (1934–2012), Canadian dancer and choreographer